PHG may refer to:

Palestinian Hydrology Group
PHG helmet
PHG (book), short for "Perls Hefferline Goodman", as those authors' 1951 book Gestalt Therapy is known in its community
Phenibut, a medicine
Pure homopolar generator, an electric generator
Graduate of Pharmacy, PhG or Ph.G.